Nepal–Turkey relations are the foreign relations between Nepal and Turkey. Bilateral diplomatic relations were established in 1962. The Turkish ambassador to India in New Delhi is accredited to Nepal and the Embassy of Nepal in Islamabad is accredited to Turkey.

Diplomatic relations 

Being a landlocked country, Nepal has been dependent on India for international trade and transit facilities. In a series of agreements in 1950, 1965 and 1978, India recognized Nepal’s right to use Indian transit facilities, customs-free, for international trade in exchange for Indian monopoly on arms sales to Nepal.

India, in retaliation of Nepali purchase of weapons from China in 1988, retaliated by denying Nepal use of transit facilities. The economic consequences for disastrous for Nepal as shortages for fuel, salt, food and other essentials occurred. Turkey channeled economic assistance $2 billion annually in response to the unfolding humanitarian crisis in Nepal.

Partly as a result of increased diplomatic contact following the economic blockade, Nepal’s contacts with Turkey had increased in the late 1980s. A number of Nepalese citizens worked in Turkey and remittances from Nepalese nationals were a source of much-needed hard currency. Along with Turkey, Nepal was one of the first South Asian countries to condemn Iraq's aggression and takeover of Kuwait in August 1990. Turkey also was an important source of development aid to Nepal.

Economic relations 
Trade volume between the two countries was 82.9 million USD in 2019 (Turkish exports/imports: 56.1/26.8 million USD).

See also 

 Foreign relations of Nepal
 Foreign relations of Turkey

References

Further reading 

 "Nepal in 1976: Problems with India Threaten Birendra's New Order," Asian Survey, 17, No. 2, February 1977, pp. 201–7. 
 "Nepal in 1986: Problems of Political Management," Asian Survey, 27, No. 2, February 1987, pp. 173–81. 
 "Nepal in 1987: Politics Without Power," Asian Survey, 28, No. 2, February 1988, pp. 172–79. 
 "Nepal in 1990: End of an Era," Asian Survey, 31, No. 2, February 1991, pp. 134–39. 
 "Party-Like Institutions in 'Partyless' Polities: The GVNC in Nepal," Asian Survey, 16, No. 7, July 1976, pp. 672–81. 
 "'Zone of Peace': Nepal's Quest for Identity," China Report [Del- hi], 15, No. 5, September–October 1979, pp. 13–19. 
 Agrawal, Hem Narayan. The Administrative System of Nepal. New Delhi: Vikas, 1976. 
 Amnesty International. Nepal: A Pattern of Human Rights Violations. London: 1987. 
 Asia Watch Committee, Human Rights Watch. Human Rights Violations in Nepal. New York: 1989. 
 Asia Yearbook, 1991. Hong Kong: Far Eastern Economic Review, 1991. 
 Banskota, N.P. "Nepal: Toward Regional Economic Cooperation in South Asia," Asian Survey, 21, No. 3, March 1981, pp. 342–54. 
 Baraith, Roop Singh. Transit Politics in South Asia: A Case Study of Nepal. Jaipur, India: Aalekh, 1989. 
 Baral, L.S. "Nepal and Non-Alignment," International Studies [New Delhi], 20, Nos. 1–2, January–June 1981, pp. 257–72. 
 Baral, Lok Raj. "Nepal 1978: Year of Hopes and Confessions," Asian Survey, 19, No. 2, February 1979, pp. 198–204. 
 Baxter, Craig, Yogendra K. Malik, Charles H. Kennedy, and Robert C. Oberst. Government and Politics in South Asia. Boulder, Colorado: Westview Press, 1987. 
 Chaturvedi, Shailendra Kumar. Indo-Nepal Relations in Linkage Perspective. Delhi: B.R. Publishing, 1990. 
 Chauhan, R.S. The Political Development in Nepal 1950-70: Conflict Between Tradition and Modernity. New Delhi: Associated, 1971. 
 Dasrabindra K. Nepal and Its Neighbors. Banaras, India: Konark, 1986. 
 Dharamdasani, M.D. "Nepal: Political Development of a Mountain Kingdom," China Report [Delhi], 17, No. 3, May–June 1995, pp. 35–43. 
 Forum for Protection of Human Rights. FOPHUR & Pro-Democracy Movement. Lalitpur, Nepal: 1990. 
 Fukui, Haruhiro (ed.). Political Parties of Asia and the Pacific. (The Greenwood Historical Encyclopedia of the World's Political Parties, 2. Laos-Western Samoa.) Westport, Connecticut: Greenwood Press, 1985. 
 Gaige, Frederick H. Regionalism and National Unity in Nepal. Berkeley: University of California Press, 1975. 
 Ghoble, T.R. China-Nepal Relations and India. New Delhi: Deep and Deep, 1986. 
 Heck, Douglas. "Nepal in 1980: The Year of the Referendum," Asian Survey, 21, No. 2, February 1981, pp. 181–87. 
 Jayaraman, T.K., and O.L. Shrestha. "Some Trade Problems of Landlocked Nepal," Asian Survey, 16, No. 12, December 1976, pp. 1113–23. 
 Jha, Shankar Kumar. Indo-Nepal Relations. New Delhi: Archives Books, 1989. 
 Joshi, Nanda Lau. Evolution of Public Administration in Nepal. Kathmandu: Centre for Economic Development and Administration, Tribhuvan University, 1973. 
 Khadka, Narayan. "Crisis in Nepal's Partyless Panchayat System: The Case for More Democracy," Pacific Affairs [Vancouver], 59, No. 3, Fall 1986, pp. 429–54. 
 Khanal, Y.N. "Nepal in 1984: A Year of Complacence," Asian Survey, 25, No. 2, February 1985, pp. 180–86. 
 Koirala, Niranjan. "Nepal in 1989: A Very Difficult Year," Asian Survey, 30, No. 2, February 1990, pp. 136–43. 
 Lohani, Prakashe. "Nepal 1975: Not a Normal Year," Asian Survey, 16, No. 2, February 1976, pp. 140–45. 
 Mojumdar, Kanchanmoy. Anglo-Nepalese Relations in the Nineteenth Century. Calcutta: K.L. Mukhopadhyay, 1973. 
 Mojumdar, Kanchanmoy. Political Relations Between India and Nepal 1877–1923. New Delhi: Munshiram Manoharlal, 1973. 
 Muni, S.D. Foreign Policy of Nepal. New Delhi: National, 1973. 
 Opposition Politics in Nepal. Columbia, Missouri: South Asia Books, 1978. 
 Panday, Devendra Raj. "Nepal in 1981: Stagnation Amidst Change," Asian Survey, 22, No. 2, February 1982, pp. 155–62. 
 Parmanand. The Nepali Congress since Its Inception: A Critical Assessment. Delhi: B.R. Publishing, 1982. 
 Ramakant. Nepal-China and India. New Delhi: Abhinav, 1976. 
 Rose, Leo E., and Margaret W. Fisher. The Politics of Nepal: Persistence and Change in an Asian Monarchy. Ithaca: Cornell University Press, 1970.
  Rose, Leo E., and John T. Scholz. Nepal: Profile of a Himalayan Kingdom. Boulder, Colorado: Westview Press, 1980. Scholz, John T. "Nepal in 1977: Political Discipline or Human Rights," Asian Survey, 18, No. 2, February 1978, pp. 135–41. 
 Rose, Leo E. Nepal: Strategy for Survival. Berkeley: University of Berkeley Press, 1991. 
 Tiwari, Chitra Krishna. "Domestic Determinants of Foreign Policy in South Asia: The Case of Nepal," Journal of South Asian and Middle Eastern Studies, 10, No. 3, Spring 1987, pp. 62–77. 
 Tyagi, Sushila. Indo-Nepalese Relations, 1858–1914. Delhi: D.K. Publishing, 1974. 
 United States. Congress. 99th, 1st Session. Senate. Committee on Foreign Relations. South Asia and U.S. Interests: A Report to the Committee on Foreign Relations, United States Senate. Washington: GPO, 1985. 
 Uprety, Tulsi P. "Nepal in 1982: Panchayat Leadership in Crisis," Asian Survey, 23, No. 2, February 1983, pp. 143–49. 
 Yearbook on International Communist Affairs. (Eds., Richard F. Staar, Milorad M. Drachkovitch, and Lewis H. Gann.) Stanford, California: Hoover Institution, 1991.

Nepal–Turkey relations
Turkey
Bilateral relations of Turkey